"X" is a song by American pop rock group Jonas Brothers, featuring vocals from Colombian reggaeton singer-songwriter Karol G. It was released on May 15, 2020. The song was released concurrently with "Five More Minutes". Both of these songs are part of a conjoined single titled XV.

Background
On May 11, 2020, the group announced the single "X" and announced that the release of the song would be on May 15, 2020. The singles "Five More Minutes" and "X" were both featured in their tour documentary called Happiness Continues: A Jonas Brothers Concert Film, which was released in April. During an interview with Insider, Kevin Jonas said "The new single 'X' is a song that I'm so excited about". He further explained the way he feels about the collaboration is reminiscent of how he felt about the band's hit 2019 track called "Sucker", which marked their musical comeback after a six-year hiatus. "I can honestly say there was only one other time where I had a song of ours constantly in my head", Jonas said. "It was 'Sucker' and 'What a Man Gotta Do,' but 'Sucker' specifically just kind of stayed there as kind of an earworm."

Critical reception
Billboards Jessica Roiz said that "X" is "true Jonas Brothers fashion, the tune is catchy dance-pop meshed with flairs of Latin-alt rumba".

Music video
The music video released on May 18, 2020, and shows the band dancing, enjoying a beverage and playing instruments through individual phone screens against a white background. Karol G also appears on a fourth screen in an all-red ensemble as she sings her verse.

Live performances
The Jonas Brothers with Karol G performed the song live for the first time on Graduate Together: America Honors the High School Class of 2020. Members of the class of 2020 appeared on video as the brothers' personal backup dance crew. The band performed the single live with Karol G during the eighteenth season finale of The Voice on May 19, 2020. The Jonas Brothers performed "X" (without Karol G) along with "Sucker" and "What a Man Gotta Do" as exclusive 'home' sessions recorded especially for Radio 1's Big Weekend.

Charts

Weekly charts

Year-end charts

Certifications

Release history

References

2020 singles
2020 songs
Jonas Brothers songs
Karol G songs
Macaronic songs
Songs written by Shellback (record producer)
Songs written by Ali Tamposi
Songs written by Nick Jonas
Songs written by Ryan Tedder
Song recordings produced by Shellback (record producer)
Songs written by Karol G